Bill Brough (born October 15, 1966) is an American politician who served three terms in the California State Assembly. A Republican, he represented the 73rd district, encompassing southern Orange County. Prior to being elected to the state legislature, he was a Dana Point City Councilman. Previously, Brough served as chief of staff to California State Assemblywoman Diane Harkey, White House liaison at the Department of Veterans Affairs in the George W. Bush administration, and aide to former congressman Christopher Cox. In 2016, he founded the California Legislative Irish Caucus.

Personal life
After high school, Brough enlisted in the U.S. Army, serving on active duty 1986–1990, and graduated from the University of Connecticut in 1995. Brough and his wife have two children.

Sexual harassment and violence allegations

In June 2019, two women accused Brough of making unwanted sexual advances to them in public settings. Orange County Supervisor Lisa Bartlett charged that Brough cornered her in a local restaurant in March 2011, when both were serving on the Dana Point City Council, and pressed his groin against her.  After she broke free and left, she filed a complaint against him with the city.  Also, a Laguna Beach real estate agent who worked on campaigns for Bartlett and Brough, said Brough harassed her about five years prior, before he was sworn into the state Assembly in 2014.  Brough has denied the allegations.

On May 27, 2020, Brough was stripped of all his committee assignments after the California State Assembly Workplace Conduct Unit found that Brough had improperly touched and propositioned female staff members, including impliedly offering political favors in exchange for sexual activity. In 2020, The Orange County Register reported that at least six women accused Brough of sexual assault or harassment over the previous decade.

In spite of the sexual harassment allegations against him, Brough sought reelection to a fourth term in 2020.  He was soundly defeated in the primary, coming in fourth place.  Laguna Niguel Mayor Laurie Davies, a fellow Republican, went on to win the general election.

In December 2020, days after Brough left the State Assembly, a former legislative aide filed a criminal complaint against him, accusing him of raping her in 2015.

Campaign finance allegations
In August 2019, the California Ethics Commission announced it would investigate Brough's alleged misuse of campaign funds.  He is charged with spending campaign contributions to pay off his family's cell phone bill, eat at expensive restaurants, and take a personal trip to a Boston Red Sox game, among other personal expenditures.  The total payments in question since he took office add up to nearly $200,000.

2014 California State Assembly

2016 California State Assembly

2018 California State Assembly

2020 California State Assembly

References

External links 
 
 Campaign website
 Bill Brough at votesmart.org
 Join California Bill Brough

Republican Party members of the California State Assembly
Living people
People from Dana Point, California
University of Connecticut alumni
Place of birth missing (living people)
United States Army soldiers
California city council members
21st-century American politicians
1966 births